Let the Doctor Shove  is a 1980 Dutch film directed by Nikolai van der Heyde.
The composer and (music) producer of the title song is Jack de Nijs.

Cast

References

External links 
 

Dutch comedy films
1980 films
1980s Dutch-language films
Films directed by Nikolai van der Heyde